is a railway station on the Nagoya Line in Kuwana, Mie Prefecture, Japan, operated by the private railway operator Kintetsu Railway. Masuo Station is 24.8 rail kilometers from the terminus of the line at Kintetsu Nagoya Station.

Line
Kintetsu Nagoya Line

Station layout
Masuo Station has a single island platform serving 2 tracks, with 1 passing track for Yokkaichi without platform.

Platforms

Adjacent stations

History
It was renamed to its present name in 1930. The Ise Railway became the Sangu Express Electric Railway’s Ise Line on September 15, 1936, and was renamed the Nagoya Line on December 7, 1938. After merging with Osaka Electric Kido on March 15, 1941, the line became the Kansai Express Railway's Nagoya Line. This line was merged with the Nankai Electric Railway on June 1, 1944 to form Kintetsu.

References

External links
 Kintetsu: Masuo Station

Railway stations in Japan opened in 1929
Railway stations in Mie Prefecture
Stations of Kintetsu Railway